We Are the 21st Century Ambassadors of Peace & Magic is the third studio album by American indie rock duo Foxygen, released on January 22, 2013 through Jagjaguwar.

The album was promoted pre-release with the singles "Shuggie" on October 4, 2012, "San Francisco" on January 9, 2013. After the album's release, "No Destruction" was released as the third and final single on May 23, 2013.

Critical reception

Christian Taylor 90FM said of the album: "On the whole, the album carries hints of Tame Impala’s recent album, Lonerism, and adds a whole lot of swagger. Fans of Pond, the Velvet Underground, and Lou Reed should find plenty to love in this phenomenal piece of retro-rock work." Austin Trunick of Under the Radar said: "The record taps into old AM hippie rock territory ... Motown, soul, acid rock ... and even classic French pop." In a favourable review for NME, Lisa Wright states that "Foxygen have managed to spray every shade from their bizarre, Technicolor imaginations onto a record that bursts with lovable eccentricities, but never tries too hard."

Track listing

Personnel

Foxygen
Sam France – lead and backing vocals, piano, horns
Jonathan Rado – guitars, bass, piano, organ, percussion, synthesizers, mellotron

Additional musicians
Richard Swift – piano, organ, guitars, bass, drums, percussion, vocals, synthesizers, mellotron, theremin, glockenspiel
Jessie Baylin – backing vocals (track 4)
Sarah Versprille – backing vocals (track 4)
Crumbs – backing vocals (track 3)
Luke Suzumoto – handclaps, artwork

References

External links
FOXYGEN | We Are the 21st Century Ambassadors of Peace & Magic :: JAGJAGUWAR

2013 albums
Foxygen albums
Jagjaguwar albums
Albums produced by Richard Swift (singer-songwriter)